In algebra, the length of a module is a generalization of the dimension of a vector space which measures its size. page 153 It is defined to be the length of the longest chain of submodules.

The modules of finite length are finitely generated modules, but as opposite to vector spaces, many finitely generated modules have an infinite length. Finitely generated modules of finite length are also called Artinian modules and are at the basis of the theory of Artinian rings.

For vector spaces, the length equals the dimension. This is not the case in commutative algebra and algebraic geometry, where a finite length may occur only when the dimension is zero. 

The degree of an  algebraic variety is the length of the ring associated to the algebraic set of dimension zero resulting from the intersection of the variety with generic hyperplanes. In algebraic geometry, the intersection multiplicity is commonly defined as the length of a specific module.

Definition

Length of a module 
Let  be a (left or right) module over some ring .

one says that  is the length of the chain. If no such largest length exists, we say that  has infinite length. Clearly, if the length of a chain equals the length of the module, one has  and

Length of a ring 
A ring  is said to have finite length as a ring if it has finite length as a left -module.

Properties

Finite length and finite modules 
If an -module  has finite length, then it is finitely generated. If R is a field, then the converse is also true.

Relation to Artinian and Noetherian modules 
An -module  has finite length if and only if it is both a Noetherian module and an Artinian module (cf. Hopkins' theorem). Since all Artinian rings are Noetherian, this implies that a ring has finite length if and only if it is Artinian.

Behavior with respect to short exact sequences 
Supposeis a short exact sequence of -modules. Then M has finite length if and only if L and N have finite length, and we have  In particular, it implies the following two properties

 The direct sum of two modules of finite length has finite length 
 The submodule of a module with finite length has finite length, and its length is less than or equal to its parent module.

Jordan–Hölder theorem 

A composition series of the module M is a chain of the form

such that

A module M has finite length if and only if it has a (finite) composition series, and the length of every such composition series is equal to the length of M.

Examples

Finite dimensional vector spaces 
Any finite dimensional vector space  over a field  has a finite length. Given a basis  there is the chainwhich is of length . It is maximal because given any chain,the dimension of each inclusion will increase by at least . Therefore, its length and dimension coincide.

Artinian modules 
Over a base ring , Artinian modules form a class of examples of finite modules. In fact, these examples serve as the basic tools for defining the order of vanishing in intersection theory.

Zero module 
The zero module is the only one with length 0.

Simple modules 
Modules with length 1 are precisely the simple modules.

Artinian modules over Z 

Use in multiplicity theory

For the need of Intersection theory, Jean-Pierre Serre introduced a general notion of the multiplicity of a point, as the length of an Artinian local ring related to this point.

The first application was a complete definition of the intersection multiplicity, and, in particular, a statement of Bézout's theorem that asserts that the sum of the multiplicities of the intersection points of  algebraic hypersurfaces in a -dimensional projective space is either infinite or is exactly the product of the degrees of the hypersurfaces.

This definition of multiplicity is quite general, and contains as special cases most of previous notions of algebraic multiplicity.

Order of vanishing of zeros and poles 

A special case of this general definition of a multiplicity is the order of vanishing of a non-zero algebraic function  on an algebraic variety.

Example on a projective variety 
In the other case,  is a unit, so the quotient module is isomorphic toso it has length . This can be found using the maximal proper sequence

Zero and poles of an analytic function 
The order of vanishing is a generalization of the order of zeros and poles for meromorphic functions in complex analysis. This kind of information can be encoded using the length of modules. More generally, using the Weierstrass factorization theorem a meromorphic function factors aswhich is a (possibly infinite) product of linear polynomials in both the numerator and denominator.

See also 
Hilbert–Poincaré series
Weil divisor
Chow ring
Intersection theory
Weierstrass factorization theorem
Serre's multiplicity conjectures
Hilbert scheme - can be used to study modules on a scheme with a fixed length
Krull–Schmidt theorem

References

External links 

Steven H. Weintraub, Representation Theory of Finite Groups AMS (2003) , 
Allen Altman, Steven Kleiman, A term of commutative algebra. 
The Stacks project. Length

Module theory